Mamont (Russian for Mammoth) is an international modern art show and avant-garde fashion show held in Minsk, Belarus, since 1995. Competitions, presentations, and exhibitions of avant-garde painting and sculpture are held. Judges traditionally give a master class for young designers.

The concept  
Mamont intends to differ from other fashion shows by portraying clothing as an object of art, and its presentation as a performance.

Purpose 

 To show the achievements of young artists, including artists, sculptors, musicians, designers, and fashion designers.
 To draw the attention of mass media, public and professionals to the creativity of young and prospective authors.
 To give artists the possibility to acquaint the general public with their creativity.
 To expose the general public to new names and talents.
 To allow dialogue among artists.
 To make an active, creative atmosphere in the field of modern art and design.
 To create a show with an original stage and by attracting art workers, including from theater, television, and cinema.

Organizers  

 Belarusian firm Bellegprom
 The union of designers of Belarus
 Magic publishing house
 The company Center of Theatrical Initiatives

History 
Television director Yury Breus first had the idea for the event. It was intended to discover new names and concepts for TV programs, but it quickly received such popularity among young designers that became an independent event.
1st avant-garde fashion show, 24 December 1995
Grand prize: Ivan Ajplatov
2nd avant-garde fashion show, November 1996
3rd avant-garde fashion show, November 1997
4th avant-garde fashion show, 28 December 1998
Grand prize: Elena and Olga Parfenovich (original combination of black stockings and volume details from straws)
5th international avant-garde fashion show, December 1999
Grand prize: Pavel Panaskin and Alexey Lazar ("Not to touch" collection)
6th international avant-garde fashion show, 31 March-1 April 2001
Grand prize: Tatyana Kasadzhikova ("Squid" collection)
7th international avant-garde fashion show, May 2003, Minsk
No grand prize awarded
8th international modern art and avant-garde fashion show, 25–27 May 2005
Grand prize: Pavel Panaskin and Alexey Lazar ("That tea" collection)
9th international modern art and avant-garde fashion show, 25–27 May 2006
Grand prize: Hanna Baranava ("The Sun doesn't move" collection)
10th international modern art and avant-garde fashion show, 16–18 November 2007
Grand prize: Javazhyna Miklashevich ("Evolution" collection)
11th international modern art and avant-garde fashion show, 16 November 2008
Grand prize: Ekaterina Burak
12th international modern art and avant-garde fashion show, 1–2 November 2011
Grand prize: Jewgenij Iwanchik
13th international modern art and avant-garde fashion show, 20–21 April 2013
Grand prize: Elena Kolyasnikova

2013 
In the "nuance" category for the original use of folk motifs in her collection "Zapovet", Evgenia Lukjanova was the winner. In the "neon" category, Olga Kiselevich and Svetlana Ivashina, who were the 2011 winners, received an award for use of optical and light effects. The duo introduced the "Bezdna" collection. The 2011 grand prize winner, the Centre of Fashion and Beauty "Chrustal Nymph" from Gomel, was represented by a team of co-authors with a unique collection "We All Are From… or Made In China". It took first place in the "Knock-out" category as the most provocative work.

The jury liked two bright collections and they received the prize in two categories. Natalis Kostroma-Andreuk received an award in the "Narrative" (unique presentation) category as well as the "Navazhdenie" (unique ideas) category. Alena Yarkevich won in the "Nevidal" (use of innovative technology) category and in "Navorot" (unique combination of color and forms).

The grand prize winner of the 2013 festival was Elena Kolyasnikova, a production designer for the Belarusian Drama Theatre. She participates in many modern art exhibitions. Her "Dusha Dospeha" collection was represented at Mamont 2013 and was considered to be well thought-through, unique and conceptual. The most unusual part is the process of costume-making. The entire collection is made of 100% wool from Stavropol fine-wool sheep. Moreover, Elena used the technique of seamless on-wet felting the same way valenki, wool boots, are made. For five costumes  of wool was used which was turned into felt. The elements of the costumes were attached with the help of metal buttons, rivets and decorated with eyelets. This way, the collection was not sewn but constructed, which required four months. Her combination of modern costumes and medieval armor elements made Kolyasnikova the winner and grand prize holder of the 2013 festival.

Between the competition and gala concert there was also a presentation of fashion art films. 24 films were represented; the winner was the Belgian Show-room by Guido Verelst.

In the evening, "Next", a competition among body artists, took place. The winner was Vyacheslav Baranuk with the project "Old School". The first prize went to Denis Ivanov, who represented four models and the team Beauty Fusion with a dance. Artists Anastasiya Novik and Alena Mazhut presented the project "No-stop" from Molodechno with a male duo; one on roller skates and the other performing acrobatic parkour tricks.

The person of the festival 
The graphic figure drawn by artist Alexey Mihajlov became the festival symbol in 2007. Ekaterina Ljubchik became the person of the festival in 2008 and 2011.

Categories 
There are three creative categories at the festival: avant-garde fashion, body art, and video art. Video art features performances lasting no more than five minutes.

Prizes 
In 2005, 2006 and 2007 stylized bronze "golden tusk" figures (for the best suit and best collection presentation) and "golden mammoth" figures (for the best combination of all performance elements) were awarded. In 2011 the award of prizes was changed as video art was added as a category. The "golden mammoth" is awarded for the best avant-garde clothes collection, while the two "golden tusk" awards are awarded for the best video art and body art.

References 

Art festivals in Belarus